The 2022 Enfield London Borough Council election took place on 5 May 2022, alongside local elections in the other London boroughs and elections to local authorities across the United Kingdom. All 63 members of Enfield London Borough Council were elected.

In the previous election in 2018, the Labour Party maintained its control of the council, winning 46 out of the 63 seats with the Conservative Party forming the council opposition with the remaining 17 seats. The 2022 election took place under new election boundaries, which however kept the same number of councillors as before. In 2022, Labour were re-elected for a fourth term. This was the first time that Labour were re-elected with a reduced number of seats ever since the London Boroughs were created in 1964.

Background

History 

The thirty-two London boroughs were established in 1965 by the London Government Act 1963. They are the principal authorities in Greater London and have responsibilities including education, housing, planning, highways, social services, libraries, recreation, waste, environmental health and revenue collection. Some of the powers are shared with the Greater London Authority, which also manages passenger transport, police and fire.

Since its formation, Enfield has been under Labour or Conservative control. Most councillors elected to the council have been Labour or Conservative, with one Liberal Democrats having won one seat in 1974 and Save Chase Farm winning two seats in 2006. The council has had an overall Labour majority since the 2010 election, in which Labour won 36 seats and the Conservatives won 27. Save Chase Farm lost both their seats. Labour increased its majority on the council in both subsequent elections in 2014 and 2018, winning 46 seats with 54.9% of the vote to the Conservatives' seventeen with 35.2% of the vote in the latter.

Council term 
After the 2018 local election, the Labour group voted by 24 votes to 22 to replace their leader Doug Taylor with Nesil Caliskan, who consequently became the leader of the council. She became the borough's first female leader and the youngest council leader in London. In May 2019, her deputy leader Daniel Anderson and four other cabinet members stood down from the council's executive, with Anderson saying he had "been emasculated".

In July 2018, Stephanos Ioannou, a Conservative councillor for Southgate ward, was suspended from the party for sharing a 1974 newspaper frontpage covering the Turkish invasion of Cyprus with the headline "Barbarians". In September 2018, William Coleshill, a Conservative councillor for Bush Hill Park, was suspended from his party after being accused of making racist comments. Later the same month, another Conservative councillor for Bush Hill Park, Jon Daniels, resigned citing his work and family commitments. A by-election to replace him was held in November 2018, which was won by the Conservative candidate, the small business owner James Hockney. The Labour councillor Ayfer Orhan was suspended from her party in March 2019 after she shared a tweet claiming that Israel was supporting the Islamic State.

In 2019, Caliskan was found to have broken the council code of conduct after the conduct committee found that her suspension of a cabinet member without meeting her first amounted to bullying, a finding she unsuccessfully appealed. In March 2020, Anderson was found to have broken the council code of conduct after complaints from council officers that his behaviour was "aggressive and threatening" and "amounted to bullying". He was subsequently suspended from the Labour Party. In July 2020, the Labour councillor Chris Bond died. He had been a councillor in Enfield for more than 34 years. Due to the COVID-19 pandemic, a by-election to replace him could not be held until May 2021. 

In 2020, two Labour councillors who had supported Taylor over Caliskan, Derek Levy and Dinah Barry, left the Labour Party to form a new group on the council called Community First, saying that "the leadership of Enfield Labour group had effectively frozen them out of discussions on policy". Anderson joined them in August, also criticising Caliskan. A fourth Labour councillor, Dino Lemonides, joined Community First less than a week later calling the Labour group "authoritarian". In December 2020, Vicki Pite, a Labour councillor for Chase ward resigned from the council while remaining a Labour member. In March 2021, one Labour councillor, Anne Brown, defected to Community First, and another, Bernadette Lappage, resigned from the council. By-elections to replace Bond, Pite and Lappage were all held on 5 May 2021 alongside the 2021 London mayoral election and London Assembly election. Bond's seat was won by the Labour candidate, Ayten Guzel. Pite's seat was gained by the Conservative candidate Andrew Thorp, who had campaigned to protect Whitewebbs golf course. Lappage's seat was won by the Labour candidate Chinelo Anyanwu.

Later in May 2021, a Labour councillor, Charith Gunawardena, defected to the Green Party and joined the Community First group on the council. Days later, Orhan resigned from the Labour Party to join Community First shortly before an unsuccessful vote of no confidence in the council's administration. She had taken the Labour Party to court over the length of time it had taken to investigate allegations of antisemitism against her. Coleshill, who had continued to sit as an independent councillor after being suspended from the Conservative Party, was forced to stand down from the council in June 2021 after failing to attend council meetings for six months. A by-election to replace him was held in July 2021, which was won by the Conservative candidate Peter Fallart. In September 2021, Brown joined the Green Party while remaining a member of Community First. In November 2021, Orhan joined the Liberal Democrats while remaining a member of Community First.

Along with most other London boroughs, Enfield was subject to a boundary review ahead of the 2022 election. The Local Government Boundary Commission for England concluded that the council should have 63 seats, the same as previously, and produced new election boundaries following a period of consultation. The council will have thirteen three-councillor wards and twelve two-councillor wards.

Campaign 
The Liberal Democrats announced that they would campaign jointly with some independent candidates in an alliance called "Together for Enfield".

Electoral process 
Enfield, like other London borough councils, elects all of its councillors at once every four years. The previous election took place in 2018. The election will take place by multi-member first-past-the-post voting, with each ward being represented by two or three councillors. Electors will have as many votes as there are councillors to be elected in their ward, with the top two or three being elected.

All registered electors (British, Irish, Commonwealth and European Union citizens) living in London aged 18 or over will be entitled to vote in the election. People who live at two addresses in different councils, such as university students with different term-time and holiday addresses, are entitled to be registered for and vote in elections in both local authorities. Voting in-person at polling stations will take place from 7:00 to 22:00 on election day, and voters will be able to apply for postal votes or proxy votes in advance of the election.

Previous council composition

Results summary

Ward results

Arnos Grove

Bowes

Brimsdown

Bullsmoor

Bush Hill Park

Carterhatch

Cockfosters

Edmonton Green

Enfield Lock

Grange Park

Haselbury

Highfield

Jubilee

Lower Edmonton

New Southgate

Oakwood

Palmers Green

Ponders End

Ridgeway

Southbury

Southgate

Town

Upper Edmonton

Whitewebbs

Winchmore Hill

References 

Council elections in the London Borough of Enfield
Enfield